Lu Ann Meredith (July 7, 1913November 12, 1998) was an American film actress. Picked as one of the WAMPAS Baby Stars in 1934, her career did not flourish unlike a number of other awardees such as Jean Arthur and Ginger Rogers. She made a few appearances in British films, but by 1937 her film career had declined. She appeared in a total of nine films between 1934 and 1939 before retiring from acting.

Filmography
 Young and Beautiful (1934)
 Whirlpool (1934)
 Night Life of the Gods (1936)
 Ball at Savoy (1936)
 Sporting Love (1937)
 Sing as You Swing (1937)

References

Bibliography
 Gregory William Mank. Women in Horror Films, 1930s. McFarland, 2005.

External links

1913 births
1998 deaths
American film actresses
People from Dallas
American emigrants to England
American expatriates in England
WAMPAS Baby Stars
20th-century American actresses